...There's No Air to Breathe is a compilation album by Mentallo & The Fixer, released on May 19, 1997 by Zoth Ommog Records. The album serves as a greatest hits collection for the band.

Track listing

Personnel
Adapted from the ...There's No Air To Breathe liner notes.

Mentallo & The Fixer
 Dwayne Dassing (as The Fixer) – programming, producer
 Gary Dassing (as Mentallo) – vocals, programming, producer

Production and design
 Hartwerk – design

Release history

References

External links 
 ...There's No Air to Breathe at Discogs (list of releases)

1997 compilation albums
Mentallo & The Fixer albums
Zoth Ommog Records compilation albums